C-Cube Microsystems was an early company in video compression technology as well as the implementation of that technology into semiconductor integrated circuits and systems. C-Cube was the first company to deliver on the market opportunity presented by the conversion of image and video data from analog to digital formats enabling markets such as VideoCD, DVD, DirecTV, digital cable, and non-linear editing systems.

History
C-Cube was founded on August 8, 1988 by Edmund Sun from Weitek and Alexandre Balkanski. Early funding came from VC firms Hambrecht & Quist and JAFCO America Ventures as well as Japanese farm equipment manufacturer Kubota Ltd. 

Image and video technology was just beginning to make the transition from analog (VHS, Betamax, etc.) to new digital-base formats. The key issue was the amount of bandwidth required to transmit or store the digital content. Digital video compression was a key enabling technology that made digital video practical. C-Cube engineers drove the early standards for digital compression - including Eric Hamilton, chair of the JPEG committee and Didier LeGall, chair of the MPEG video committee. As a result of their familiarity of the standardization process and the standards themselves, C-Cube was able to gain advantageous knowledge in the implementation of the algorithms into high-performance silicon.

Early on, the company was recognized for technical leadership but was largely unable to turn leadership into revenues and profits. The company found focus with the hiring of Bill O'Meara as CEO in 1991. He hired a new professional management staff and procured $10 million in added investment from Sequoia Capital, Texas Instruments, and AMD in late 1992 and enabled the company to drive toward profitability based on the development of products including the CL550 JPEG codec, the CL950 MPEG II (prototype) decoder, and the CL450 MPEG I decoder.

These early-to-market devices proved the concept of digital video compression to a number of large OEM customers and led to the development of next-generation industry-enabling products including the CL4000 MPEG II encoder family that enabled the DirecTV program from Hughes and the CL480 MPEG I decoder that drove the VideoCD market in Japan and China in the mid 1990s.

C-Cube went public on the NASDAQ exchange under the symbol CUBE in 1994. Its board of directors included chairman Don Valentine of Sequoia Capital, T. J. Rodgers of Cypress Semiconductor, and Gregorio Reyes of Sandisk. O'Meara retired in 1995, turning over the office to founder Alex Balkanski. Balkanski was responsible for incubating video compression equipment company DiviCom starting in 1993 and C-Cube eventually acquired them in 1996. After this acquisition, the company changed its focus from strictly semiconductors to being both a chip and system supplier. Other acquisitions bolstered PC driver software and reference design expertise including the purchase of the software driver unit of Ring Zero as well as Media Computer Technologies (MCT) in 1995. Umesh Padval was brought in to run C-Cube Semiconductor in 1998.

During the late 1990s, C-Cube was unable to repeat its runaway hits seen earlier in the decade. The company sold its DiviCom division to Harmonic Lightwaves in May, 2000 for nearly $1.7 billion. C-Cube Semiconductor (Nasdaq CUBED) was eventually sold to competitor LSI Logic in March 2001 in a stock transaction worth $878 million. LSI sold off the consumer products business (including what was C-Cube) to Magnum Semiconductor in 2007.

Products

References

Computer companies established in 1988
Fabless semiconductor companies
Companies based in Milpitas, California
Defunct companies based in California
Defunct semiconductor companies of the United States